Ryan Matthew Dunn (June 11, 1977 – June 20, 2011) was an American stunt performer, television personality, actor and comedian. He was best known as one of the stars of the MTV reality stunt show Jackass and its film franchise.

Born in Medina, Ohio, Dunn rose to fame in the late 1990s as a member of the CKY crew with his long-time friend Bam Margera, with whom he performed extreme stunts and pranks and recorded them on video, which led to the rise of Jackass. He also hosted the TV series Homewrecker and Proving Ground, and he appeared in the feature films Blonde Ambition and Street Dreams as well as in Margera's films Haggard and Minghags. Dunn died in a car crash in 2011 at the age of 34.

Early life
Dunn was born in Medina, Ohio. He grew up in Williamsville, New York, before moving to West Chester, Pennsylvania, where he went to West Chester East High School and where he met fellow Jackass star Bam Margera on the first day of school.

Career 

Dunn took part in the characteristic stunts that made Jackass famous, and featured in five released films, Jackass: The Movie, Jackass Number Two, Jackass 2.5, Jackass 3D, and Jackass 3.5. In 2006, Dunn and Bam Margera participated in the Gumball 3000 road rally in Margera's Lamborghini Gallardo. He later went on a tour with Don Vito called "The Dunn and Vito Rock Tour" for which the DVD was released on March 20, 2007. Dunn and Margera again participated in the rally in 2008.

Bam Margera stated during a December 2, 2008, radio interview with Big O and Dukes of 106.7 WJFK-FM, that he and Dunn would be going to Italy to film Where the F*%# Are My Ancestors. That same month, Dunn appeared on the episode "Smut" of Law & Order: Special Victims Unit in December 2008. He is also featured in a movie called Street Dreams which was released in spring 2009. He co-starred along with Rob Dyrdek and Paul Rodriguez Jr. Dunn was also featured on a show with fellow Jackass star Bam Margera about them traveling through Europe in a Viva la Bam-like show called Bam's World Domination for Spike. He appeared in Jackass 3D, which was released on October 15, 2010.

Dunn co-hosted G4's Proving Ground along with Jessica Chobot, which made its premiere on June 14, 2011, six days before his death. However, according to a G4 spokesperson, the channel decided to postpone the airing of further episodes. The spokesperson added, "The show is off the schedule as of today until we discuss next steps." On June 27, G4 announced they would air the remaining episodes starting on July 19, 2011. At the time of his death, Dunn was working on the film Welcome to the Bates Motel. The film was later renamed The Bates Haunting and was released in 2013.

Personal life 
From 2002 to his death, he was in a long-term relationship with Angie Cuturic, who had a part in Margera's directorial debut Haggard: The Movie and later Minghags. Dunn had several tattoos of Cuturic, including in his inner arm and left ring finger.

During shooting of the closing scenes for Jackass Number Two in 2006, Dunn injured his shoulder during one of his final scenes, in which he and co-star Bam Margera are pulled out of shot by a running horse by a rope tied around their feet. Dunn dropped straight onto his shoulder, causing damage to the muscles and leading to a blood clot that was at one point life-threatening, due to its proximity to his heart and brain. While seeking treatment for it and Lyme disease, Dunn became depressed, eventually cutting off all contact with his friends, co-workers, and others for nearly two years, and did not participate in Jackassworld.com: 24 Hour Takeover, or any subsequent events related to the films and series. He eventually returned to the Jackass cast in the production of Jackass 3D and Jackass 3.5 later saying that he was happy to rejoin the cast and had more enjoyment working on Jackass 3D than any previous film endeavors.

Death 

On June 20, 2011, at around 3:30 a.m. EDT, Dunn and Zachary Hartwell, a production assistant on Jackass Number Two, were returning from Barnaby's West Chester, a West Chester bar, in Dunn's Porsche 911 GT3 when Dunn veered off the road and struck a tree, after which the Porsche burst into flames in West Goshen Township, Chester County, Pennsylvania. Both Dunn, who had turned 34 nine days prior, and 30-year-old Hartwell were killed in the crash. 

Hours before the crash, Dunn had posted a photo to his Twitter account of himself and Hartwell drinking at the bar. He was identified in the police report as the vehicle's driver, and a subsequent toxicology report showed a blood alcohol level of 0.196 g/dL – more than twice the state's legal limit of 0.08%.

Prior to the drunk-driving crash that resulted in his death, Dunn had been convicted for driving under the influence of alcohol, resulting in his completing a treatment program as part of his sentence. "In 2005, Dunn was charged with driving under the influence of alcohol and entered a first-offender program that allowed him to clear his record after a certain period of good behavior," according to Patrick Carmody, Chester County Assistant District Attorney.

Wrongful-death lawsuit 
In August 2012, the parents of Zachary Hartwell filed a civil suit in the Court of Common Pleas of Philadelphia County, naming the co-administrators of Dunn's estate as defendants, along with Barnaby's West Chester. The suit claims negligence and recklessness, as well as wrongful death in the incident that killed Hartwell.

The plaintiffs claim that Dunn displayed negligence and recklessness in failing to have his vehicle under adequate and proper control, operating his vehicle under the influence of alcohol, operating his vehicle at an excessive speed and violently veering off a road and into a tree, among other alleged transgressions. They are seeking unspecified punitive and compensatory damages, as well as interest, court costs and "delay damages as the law may allow."

Hartwell's parents sought to recover from Dunn's estate the following: the costs of their son's funeral, wages due for his behind-the-scenes and stunt work on various Jackass projects, the projected loss of income from his premature death, pain & suffering, and other damages, but they did not specify an amount. As of 2023, it is unclear what the resolution of this lawsuit was.

Legacy 
Dunn is remembered by friends and fans alike as the "go-to guy for outrageous stunts that even such stalwarts as Steve-O weren't willing to try" and "the kind of guy who would do anything for a friend," gaining the nickname "Random Hero".

Following the news of his death, Dickhouse Productions and the producers of the show released the following statement:

I don't really know what to say right now everybody, because the sadness is overwhelming, but today we lost one of our own. Our brother Ryan Dunn has passed. He died in a car wreck in West Goshen, Pennsylvania this morning at 3 a.m.
 that's tough to write. Our hearts go out to his family and his beloved Angie. Ryan will be missed and remembered by us all. Thanks for the kind words of support everybody.

Many celebrities expressed their grief and condolences on Twitter, including Sofia Coppola, Tom Green, Carey Hart, Dwayne Johnson, Tony Hawk, and his Jackass cast members.

Kings of Leon also paid homage to Dunn at their London Hyde Park concert by dedicating their song "McFearless" to him. Skrillex dedicated his remix of the song "Cinema" to Dunn after a moment of silence. Alkaline Trio also dedicated their song "Goodbye Forever" to Dunn on their fifteen-year anniversary tour. Singer/songwriter Roger Alan Wade wrote and composed the song "The Light Outlives the Star", while also dedicating it to Dunn. Occasional Jackass member Loomis Fall also wrote the song "Bid Farewell" in memory of Dunn. Both songs were used in a music video tribute by Dickhouse Productions for its official website.

Dunn also came in at number three in top trending searches of 2011 on Google's Zeitgeist report following his death.

On November 28, 2011, MTV aired an hour-long tribute to Dunn, where several details of his life previously unknown to the public were revealed as well as never-before-seen stunts he performed. Dunn's parents, sister, friends and both Jackass and Viva La Bam cast mates recalled his early beginnings to final months.

The 2013 film Jackass Presents: Bad Grandpa is dedicated to him, and the 2022 film Jackass Forever included a mid-credits tribute to Dunn. The 2022 film Jackass 4.5 is also dedicated to him.

Filmography

Discography 
The Alter Boys – The Exotic Sounds of the Alter Boys (2005)

References

External links 

Ryan Dunn at Find a Grave

1977 births
2011 deaths
20th-century American male actors
21st-century American male actors
Alcohol-related deaths in Pennsylvania
Accidental deaths in Pennsylvania
American male comedians
American male film actors
American stunt performers
American television personalities
Burials in Ohio
CKY
Jackass (TV series)
People from Chester County, Pennsylvania
People from Medina, Ohio
Road incident deaths in Pennsylvania
Deaths from fire in the United States
People from Brecksville, Ohio